Vereinigung der Buchantiquare und Kupferstichhändler in der Schweiz (VEBUKU), the antiquarian booksellers association of Switzerland, was founded in 1939 and has been a member of the International League of Antiquarian Booksellers (ILAB) since 1947.

The VEBUKU unites people dealing in old and modern prints and drawings, old and rare books, periodicals, manuscripts and autographs. Its aim is to protect and encourage a fair trade based on the experience and cultural responsibility of its members.

The annual and sole antiquarian bookfair in Switzerland (Antiquariats-Messe Zürich) is loyally supported by the VEBUKU.

See also
International League of Antiquarian Booksellers
Australian and New Zealand Association of Antiquarian Booksellers
Antiquarian Booksellers Association of Austria
Antiquarian Booksellers Association
Syndicat National de la Librairie Ancienne et Moderne (SLAM)
Antiquarian Booksellers' Association of America
Antiquarian Booksellers Association of Canada
Danish Antiquarian Booksellers Association
Belgian Antiquarian Booksellers Association
Antiquarian Booksellers Association of Japan
Antiquarian Booksellers Association of Korea
Nederlandsche Vereeniging van Antiquaren

External links
VEBUKU site 
Antiquariats-Messe Zürich site 

Antiquarian booksellers
1939 establishments in Switzerland